Kirov is the largest city and administrative center of Kirov Oblast, Russia. It is located on the Vyatka River in European Russia, 896 km northeast of Moscow.  Its population was 518,348 in 2020. Kirov is a historical, cultural, industrial, and scientific center of Priural'e (territory on the west side of the Ural Mountains); place of origin for Dymkovo toys; the most eastern city founded during the times of Kievan Rus'.

The city's former and historic names are Khlynov (from 1457 to 1780), and Vyatka (until 1934).

History

Principality and republic 

The native Slavic tribe of Central Russia and Volga regions, the Vyatichis (also called Viatichi), mixed here with the Novgorodian Slovenes and Finno-Ugric people. According to the medieval chronicles the first Russian settlements in the area appeared in 12th century. Kirov itself was first mentioned (as Vyatka) for the first time in 1374 when Novgorod ushkuyniks plundered it on their way to Bolghar. Vyatka was governed by a public assembly (veche) as other Northern Russian republics of Pskov and Novgorod.

At different times in the late 14th and 15th centuries Vyatka militias raided Ustyug, Novgorod and Tatar lands on Kama and Volga. Vyatka supported Yury of Zvenigorod during the Muscovite Civil War and after his party lost the victorious Vasily II sent Muscovite armies twice against Vyatka to subjugate it and eventually it was forced to accept the suzerainty of Moscow while retaining a significant measure of autonomy. In 1469 Vyatka allied with Khan Ibrahim of the Khanate of Kazan and did not take part in the campaign of Ivan III against the khanate.

After several unsuccessful campaigns by Moscow against Vyatka in 1480s, the latter was finally annexed in 1489.

Part of Grand Duchy of Moscow and Russian Empire 

Khlynov became known throughout Russia for its clay statuettes and whistles. The town's oldest surviving monument is the Assumption Cathedral (1689), an imposing structure surmounted by five globular domes.

In 1780, Catherine the Great renamed the town Vyatka and made it the seat of Vyatka Governorate. The town also served as a place of exile, notably for Alexander Herzen, Alexander Vitberg, and Mikhail Saltykov-Shchedrin. By the end of the 19th century, it was an important station on the Trans-Siberian railway.

Soviet and post-Soviet period 
In December 1934, it was renamed after the Soviet communist party functionary Sergey Kirov, who was assassinated on December 1, despite the fact that he had never lived in the country. There have been movements to restore the city's original name following the collapse of the Soviet Union, although none of them have been successful so far.

Administrative and municipal status
Kirov is the administrative center of the oblast. Within the framework of administrative divisions, it is, together with 134 rural localities, incorporated as the City of Kirov—an administrative unit with the status equal to that of the districts. As a municipal division, the City of Kirov is incorporated as Kirov Urban Okrug.

Economy
Kirov is a major transport hub (railway; Trans-Siberian main) and river port. It is served by Kirov Pobedilovo airport. During the 1990s this airport was closed and for several years provided only irregular service. During the 2003-2006 summer seasons there were signs of a revival in air transportation as several companies attempted to establish flight routes from Kirov to Moscow and Krasnodar. Since 2006 Kirov airport has been used by a local company operating flights to Moscow.

The Kirov River port went bankrupt in the late 1990s and all its river boats were sold to other regions. Kirov is a center of machine building; metallurgy, light, the printing trade, biochemical and the timber industry.

Culture

Museums
Kirov Regional Museum
Kirov Regional Art Museum in honor V.M. and A.M. Vasnetsov

Vyatka Museum of Art, one of the oldest museums in Russia, was founded in 1910 by local artists.

The idea of creation belongs to natives of Vyatka land, brothers artists Viktor Vasnetsov and Apollinary Vasnetsov. At the core of the collection — works that received the most part in the 1910-1920s from the State Museum Fund, private collections and as gifts — from patrons and artists. Today the museum has more than fifteen thousand exhibits and is located in four buildings in Kirov downtown.
Museum of K.E. Tsiolkovsky, Aviation & Space
Vyatka cabinet of curiosities
Kirov diorama
House-Museum of M.E. Saltykov-Shchedrin
Museum of A. Green
House-Museum of N. Khokhryakova
Kirov exhibition hall
Kirov Planetarium
Vyatka paleontological museum

Theaters
Kirov Oblast Drama Theater
Kirov State Puppet Theater
Kirov State Theater of Young Spectators "Theater of the Spasskaya"

Circus
Kirov State Circus

According to a report in Pravda dated January 4, 2005, Kirov is known as the "city of twins" for the unusually high number of multiple births there.

According to a report, the city is home to a high concentration of red-haired individuals.

Sports

Rodina plays in the highest division of Russian Bandy League. Their home arena has a capacity of 7500. It was the venue of the national final in 2013.  Rodina-2 will participate in the Russian Rink Bandy Cup 2017.

Education
Kirov is the home of Vyatka State University, former Vyatka University for the Humanities, Vyatka Agricultural Academy and Kirov State Medical University.

Climate
Kirov has a humid continental climate (Köppen climate classification Dfb). Summers are warm and rainy, coupled with cool nights, while winters are cold and extremely snowy, with snow falling on most days during winter.

Gallery

Twin towns – sister cities

Kirov is twinned with:
 Siedlce, Poland

Notable people
Anna Alminova (born 1985), middle-distance runner
Yuri Ardashev (born 1965), theater director, actor
Ekaterina Atalik (born 1982), chess player
Mikhail Bagayev (born 1985), association football player
Aleksey Borovitin (born 1954), ski jumper
Yevgeny Charushin (1901–1965), illustrator,  author of children's literature
Oksana Domnina (born 1984), ice dancer
Vyacheslav Dryagin (1940–2002), Nordic combined skier
Boris Farmakovsky (1870–1928), historian, archaeologist
Bl. Leonid Feodorov (1879–1935), first Exarch of the Russian Byzantine Catholic Church
Matvey Gusev (1826–1866), astronomer
Maria Isakova (1918–2011), speed skater
Kirill Khaliavin (born 1990), ice dancer
Lev Knyazev (1926–2012), writer
Olga Kuragina (born 1959), athlete
Alexey Kuzmichev (born 1962), businessman
Boris Kuznetsov (born 1944), lawyer
Andrei Malykh (born 1988), association football player
Ksenia Monko (born 1922), ice dancer
Sergey Obukhov (born 1974), bandy player
Svetlana Pletnyova (1926–2008), historian, archaeologist
Aleksei Pugin (born 1987), association football player
Ivan Shefer (born 1983), ice dancer
Yekaterina Shikhova (born 1985), speed skater
Alexei Sitnikov (born 1986), ice dancer
Alexander Stolbov (born 1929), painter
Nikolai Tchaikovsky (1851–1926), revolutionary, politician
Mikhail Tyufyakov (born 1974), association football player and manager
Vladimir Urin (born 1947), theater director, actor
Yuri Vshivtsev (1940–2010), association football player
Valentin Yanin (born 1929), historian, archaeologist
Julia Zlobina (born 1989), ice dancer
Polina Khonina (born 1998), rhythmic gymnast

References

Notes

Sources

Further reading
 Vyatka. Materials for the History of the 17th and 18th Centuries (1887) (Вятка. Материалы для истории города XVII и XVIII столетий) at Runivers.ru in DjVu and PDF formats

External links

Official website of Kirov  
Directory of organizations in Kirov 

 
Vyatsky Uyezd
Populated places established in the 1370s